I. Periyasamy is an Indian Tamil politician who serves as the Rural Development Minister of Tamil Nadu and the former minister for Co-Operation from 2021 to 2022;  Revenue and Housing under the DMK regime from 2006 to 2011. He was born in Batlagundu on 6 January 1953. His son I. P. Senthil Kumar is an MLA of Palani constituency in Tamil nadu.

Elections Contested and Results

Political career 
1986-1991                Chairman, Batlagundu Union
1989-1991 member of Tamilnadu legislative assembly
1996-2001 Minister for small industries and noon meal in Tamil nadu government
From 2006 to 2011   Minister for Revenue and Housing in Tamil Nadu government.
Elected in 2011 Legislative Assembly election From Athoor. 2011-2016 Member, Tamil Nadu Legislative Assembly in opposition party
Elected in 2016 Legislative Assembly election From Athoor. 
From 2016 Member, Tamil Nadu Legislative Assembly
From 2021 Minister of Co-operation, Government of Tamilnadu.

References 

Dravida Munnetra Kazhagam politicians
State cabinet ministers of Tamil Nadu
Living people
1953 births
Tamil Nadu MLAs 1989–1991
Tamil Nadu MLAs 1996–2001
Tamil Nadu MLAs 2006–2011
Tamil Nadu MLAs 2011–2016
Tamil Nadu MLAs 2016–2021
Tamil Nadu MLAs 2021–2026